Qushchi (Romanized as Qūshchī; also known as Ghoshchi, Gūchi, and Kushi) is a city in, and the capital of, Anzal District of Urmia County, West Azerbaijan province, Iran. At the 2006 census, its population was 2,832 in 828 households. The following census in 2011 counted 2,526 people in 844 households. The latest census in 2016 showed a population of 2,787 people in 935 households.

References 

Urmia County

Cities in West Azerbaijan Province

Populated places in West Azerbaijan Province

Populated places in Urmia County